Julia Nussenbaum (1913 – April 18, 1937)  was a violinist who studied at the Juilliard School in New York. She initially performed professionally as a classical musician, but was persuaded to move to night club playing by Mischa Rosenbaum. She then performed under the name of Tania Lubova and/or Tania Lee Lova. 
She was murdered by  Rosenbaum, 31, who had become her manager/ director in a West 43rd Street, Manhattan, New York rehearsal studio, in 1937.

Rosenbaum was a married man when he became infatuated with Nussenbaum, although he had been separated from his wife for two years. On the day prior to the slaying Rosenbaum telephoned Nussenbaum and arranged a meeting, to which she reluctantly agreed. Prior to their rendezvous at the studio Rosenbaum became intoxicated drinking red wine. Rosenbaum found a hammer at the Hotel Normandie which he brought with him to the meeting. He claimed that Nussenbaum struck him on the arm and shoulder with a stick before he hit her on the forehead, causing injuries from which she subsequently died.

Rosenbaum hid her unconscious body behind a soundproof curtain, where she was found some hours later by Moya Engels, a dancer. She was taken to hospital, where she died six hours after admittance.

Nussenbaum's Aunt, Mae Stock Rich, later told the papers that Nussenbaum had been threatened by Rosenbaum on numerous occasions, and that her father had been to see him and warned him to desist. However, Rosenbaum was still annoying her, hence her reluctance to meet with him on the fatal day.

Although initially charged with first degree murder, Rosenbaum pleaded guilty to second degree murder on June 7, 1937. Judge Saul S. Streit accepted the plea on the recommendation of New York City District Attorney William C. Dodge.

Samuel Leibowitz, the famous defense lawyer employed by Rosenbaum's brother, Zachary, had already stated that he planned to use the 'homewrecker' defence that had proved successful in earlier cases, although Nussenbaum's family was adamant that she had not known that Rosenbaum was married. In agreeing to the plea, Dodge believed it wise to uphold the reputation of Nussenbaum and to forgo the $800 daily expense New York would save by not having an extended trial.

Rosenbaum said that he regretted killing Nussenbaum. He intended to become supervisor of prison theatrical productions after his June 21, 1937 sentencing.  He was sentenced to 35 years to life.  Judge Streit stated, "I can't see why he brought that hammer there, or why he struck her from eight to twelve blows with it.  I think there is sufficient evidence here for a jury to have found him guilty of murder in the first degree."

References

External links 
 https://news.google.com/newspapers?nid=1955&dat=19370419&id=XBoyAAAAIBAJ&sjid=jeIFAAAAIBAJ&pg=4871,4304468

1913 births
1937 deaths
American murder victims
People murdered in New York City
20th-century American violinists
Women classical violinists
20th-century women musicians
1937 murders in the United States
Deaths by beating in the United States
Violence against women in the United States
Juilliard School alumni
History of women in New York City